Xiangyang is a town of Tongjiang, Jiamusi, Heilongjiang, China. , it has 10 villages under its administration.

References

Township-level divisions of Heilongjiang
Tongjiang, Heilongjiang